Adobe Ranch also known as Adobe, is a locale in Socorro County, New Mexico, United States.

History 
Adobe was a stagecoach stop in the 19th century. It had a post office from 1933 to 1938, when mail was sent to Bingham.

The Site Today
The site of Adobe is now occupied by the Adobe Ranch, 32 miles east of San Antonio, New Mexico on U.S. Route 380.

References 

Ghost towns in New Mexico
Geography of Socorro County, New Mexico
Populated places in New Mexico